Diospyros insignis, is an evergreen tree in the ebony family, distributed in  Western Ghats of India and Sri Lanka.

References 

Plantnet

External resources

insignis
Flora of India (region)
Flora of Sri Lanka